Edit Matei (née Török; born 16 October 1964), also spelled as Edith Matei, is a Romanian former handballer who played for the Romania national team. After the fall of communism in Romania, she chose to represent Austria. Together with Cristina Vărzaru, Matei holds the record for the most Champions League wins of a Romanian player (4). As a national team player, she competed at the 1992 Summer Olympics, but also at several world championships. 

A severe knee injury effectively ended her career at the age of just 31.  

In 2010, she was given the award of Cetățean de onoare ("Honorary Citizen") of the city of Râmnicu Vâlcea (where she resides).

Trophies 
Liga Națională:
Winner: 1989, 1990, 1991

Cupa României:
Winner: 1984, 1990

WHA:
Winner: 1992, 1993, 1994, 1995

ÖHB-Cup:
Winner: 1992, 1993, 1994, 1995

EHF Champions League:
Winner: 1992, 1993, 1994, 1995

IHF Cup:
Winner: 1984, 1989

IHF Super Cup:
Winner: 1984

Personal life 
She is the younger sister of Maria Török-Duca.

References

External links

  
1964 births
Living people
People from Sfântu Gheorghe 
Romanian female handball players 
Austrian female handball players
Olympic handball players of Austria
Handball players at the 1992 Summer Olympics
SCM Râmnicu Vâlcea (handball) players
Expatriate handball players  
Romanian people of Hungarian descent  
Romanian expatriate sportspeople in Austria
Naturalised citizens of Austria
 
 

Romanian sportspeople of Hungarian descent